Shwe Thanlwin Company is a major Burmese company, which imports a large number of motor vehicles, construction goods and heavy machinery into Myanmar.  It was founded by Kyaw Win, a close associate of Kyaw Hsan, a former military general, and enjoyed an exclusive business relationship with the Ministry of Industry in the 2000s.

Shwe Than Lwin is one of the few companies allowed to import coconut cooking oil and cement and agricultural projects in Irrawaddy division and is the sole distributor of tires from Thaton Tire Industry, which is under the Ministry of Industry (2). Following Cyclone Nargis, Shwe Thanlwin was one of the companies awarded contracts by the State Peace and Development Council for reconstruction work in the Ayeyarwady delta region, including low-cost homes for refugees. Shwe Thanlwin owns Sky Net, a satellite television channel, through Shwe Thanlwin Media, which was launched on 6 October 2010. Shwe Thanlwin also maintains the Bago-Nyaunglebin portion of the National Highway 1 (Burma).

In 2014, the Central Bank of Myanmar issued a license to Shwe Rural and Urban Development Bank, which is a subsidiary of Shwe Thanlwin.

References

Conglomerate companies of Myanmar
Holding companies established in 1998
1998 establishments in Myanmar